Andriy Ralyuchenko (born 8 June 1995) is a Ukrainian professional footballer who plays as a midfielder for Metalist Kharkiv.

Career
Ralyuchenko is a product of the FC Metalist School System.

He spent his career in the Ukrainian Premier League Reserves club FC Metalist. In 2015 Ralyuchenko was promoted to the Ukrainian Premier League's squad. He made his debut for Metalist Kharkiv in the Ukrainian Premier League in the match against FC Volyn Lutsk on 6 March 2016.

In July 2016 he was signed by Veres Rivne. In December 2016 contract was terminated.

He is son of Serhiy Ralyuchenko.

References

External links
 
 

1995 births
Living people
Footballers from Kharkiv
Ukrainian footballers
FC Metalist Kharkiv players
Ukrainian Premier League players
Ukrainian First League players
Ukrainian Second League players
Association football midfielders
NK Veres Rivne players
FC Metalist 1925 Kharkiv players
FC Hirnyk-Sport Horishni Plavni players
FC Vovchansk players